There are many Catholic pilgrimage sites in Lithuania. There is no official list or designation of the sites. The government established the Pilgrim Route of John Paul II (16 sites) in 2007 though there are many more sites that attract local pilgrims. There are many sites visited by residents of the same parish or deanery, or sites that saw their devotion diminish through the years. Priest Robertas Gedvydas Skrinskas in his 1999 guide to pilgrimage sites counted more than 100 Marian images that are considered miraculous and 25 sites of Marian apparitions. As of 2013, there were 33 Lourdes grottoes in Lithuania, mainly in Samogitia. The list below includes only the key sites that continue to be visited by pilgrims.

History

Catholic pilgrimage sites in Lithuania started developing in the 17th century. Such delayed development was caused by the late Christianization of Lithuania in 1387 and the slow adoption of Christianity among the population that still worshiped pagan gods. The first known pilgrimage took place in 1604 when Bishop  organized a Jesuit pilgrimage from Vilnius to the Mother of God of Trakai. Šiluva became a pilgrimage destination after a Marian apparition in 1608—the only recognized apparition in Lithuania. The first cavalries in Žemaičių Kalvarija and Verkiai (Vilnius) were built in 1637–1642 and 1662–1669. Vilnius attracted pilgrims not only with the Calvary, but also with the relics of Saint Casimir in Vilnius Cathedral (dedicated Chapel of Saint Casimir was completed in 1636) and Our Lady of the Gate of Dawn (dedicated chapel was completed in 1671). Many pilgrims traveled not to visit specific sites but to get an indulgence during parish festivals.

In 1993, during his visit to Lithuania, Pope John Paul II visited several key pilgrimage sites, including the Gate of Dawn, Hill of Crosses, and Šiluva. In 2007, for the 15th anniversary of his visit, Lithuanian bishops and Lithuanian government established a pilgrim route of Pope John Paul II with 14 sites; two more sites were added in 2009. The route includes Šiauliai Cathedral and Christ's Resurrection Church, Kaunas due to their architectural and historical significance. In 2013, several Municipalities of Lithuania established several routes inspired by Camino de Santiago (St. James Way) that connect different churches of St. James in different regions of Lithuania.

List

References

External links
 Pilgrim Route of John Paul II
 Pilgrim's Guide to Marian Sites 

 
Lithuania
Catholic pilgrimage
Catholic pilgrimage sites